5254 Ulysses is a large Jupiter trojan from the Greek camp, approximately  in diameter. It was discovered on 7 November 1986, by Belgian astronomer Eric Elst at the Haute-Provence Observatory in Saint-Michel-l'Observatoire near Marseille, southeastern France. The assumed C-type asteroid belongs to the 40 largest Jupiter trojans and has a longer-than-average rotation period of 28.72 hours. It was later named after "Ulysses", the Latinized name of the legendary hero from Greek mythology, Odysseus.

Orbit and classification 

Ulysses is a dark Jovian asteroid orbiting in the leading Greek camp at Jupiter's  Lagrangian point, 60° ahead of its orbit in a 1:1 resonance (see Trojans in astronomy). It is also a non-family asteroid in the Jovian background population.

It orbits the Sun at a distance of 4.6–5.9 AU once every 11 years and 12 months (4,377 days; semi-major axis of 5.24 AU). Its orbit has an eccentricity of 0.12 and an inclination of 24° with respect to the ecliptic. The asteroid's observation arc begins with its discovery observation in November 1986.

Physical characteristics 

Ulysses is an assumed, carbonaceous C-type asteroid. Its V–I color index of 0.97 is typical for most D-type Jupiter trojans.

Photometry 

In September 1994, photometric observations of Ulysses were made by astronomers Stefano Mottola and Uri Carsenty at ESO's La Silla Observatory, Chile, using the Bochum 0.61-metre Telescope. The observations were used to build a lightcurve showing a well-defined rotation period of 28.72 hours with a brightness variation of 0.32 magnitude. In March 2014, another rotational lightcurve was obtained in the R-band by astronomers at the Palomar Transient Factory, California, which gave a concurring period of 28.7840 hours with an amplitude of 0.33 magnitude. While not being a slow rotator, Ulysses period longer than the 2 to 20 hours measured for most asteroids.

Diameter and albedo 

According to the surveys carried out by the Infrared Astronomical Satellite (IRAS), the Japanese Akari satellite, and the NEOWISE mission of NASA's Wide-field Infrared Survey Explorer, Ulysses measures between 76.15 and 80.00 kilometers in diameter and its surface has an albedo between 0.058 and 0.087. The Collaborative Asteroid Lightcurve Link derives an albedo of 0.0608 and a diameter of 77.93 kilometers based on an absolute magnitude of 9.2.

Naming 

This minor planet is named after Ulysses, the Latinized name of Odysseus, who is the hero in Homer's Iliad and Odyssey, the two major ancient Greek epic poems. In the Trojan War, he killed the Trojan Diomedes, restored the command of King Agamemnon and rallied the tired Greeks. Odysseus also thought of building the great wooden Trojan Horse.

After the war, he went on a nine-year-long adventurous journey and met the young and pretty Nausicaa, as narrated in the Odyssey. The famous novel Ulysses by Irish poet James Joyce is also titled after Odysseus Latinized name. For reference, also see the minor planets 1143 Odysseus, 5700 Homerus, 911 Agamemnon, 1437 Diomedes, 192 Nausikaa and 5418 Joyce. The approved naming citation was published by the Minor Planet Center on 10 November 1992.

In popular culture 
 In the flight-sim game Ace Combat Infinity, the asteroid is named "Ulysses 1986VG1" and is identified as a moon of Jupiter rather than a Trojan. Its collision with a previously undiscovered asteroid named Polyphemus in 1994 propels a swarm of meteoroids towards the Earth, resulting in catastrophic worldwide impact events in 1999.

References

External links 

 Asteroid Lightcurve Database (LCDB), query form (info )
 Dictionary of Minor Planet Names, Google books
 Discovery Circumstances: Numbered Minor Planets (5001)-(10000) – Minor Planet Center
 
 

005254
Discoveries by Eric Walter Elst
Named minor planets
19861107